A list of films produced in Argentina in 1953:

External links and references
 Argentine films of 1953 at the Internet Movie Database

1953
Lists of 1953 films by country or language
Films